The Serrano class was a series of six destroyers, built to a British design, which served with the Chilean Navy from 1928 to 1967. In 1927 Chile ordered the Serrano class from John I. Thornycroft & Company in the United Kingdom at the cost of £230,000 for each ship to enhance the Chilean Navy's ability to patrol its extensive coastline.  The six vessels were completed by 1929. Serrano, Orella and Hyatt were equipped for minelaying, and Aldea, Riquelme and Videla for minesweeping.

Because of weak hull construction the ships had been assessed unsuitable for service along the southern Chilean coast, where it was necessary to use older ships of  instead. The destroyers remained in service until the mid-1960s.

Design and description
Due to its longstanding relationship with the United Kingdom and the quality of British destroyer designs at the time, Chile opted for the John I. Thornycroft & Company option in an international competition to build the Chilean Navy new destroyers. The design followed a standard British layout, but was reduced in size and power.

These in turn were powered by steam from three Thornycroft boilers. They had a complement of 130 officers and ratings.

The Serrano class was armed with three single /45 calibre guns with half-height gun shields. The lack of a fourth gun on the quarterdeck allowed the destroyers to be fitted with minelaying or minesweeping gear. Serrano, Orella and Hyatt were fitted for minelaying, while Riquelme, Aldea and Videla were fitted for minesweeping. For secondary armament for anti-aircraft (AA) defence, the Serrano class was fitted with a single /40 AA gun and three machine guns. The destroyers also had two triple-mounted torpedo tubes for  torpedoes. They were fitted with two depth charge throwers for anti-submarine warfare (ASW).

Refit
The Serrano class underwent very little modification during their service lives. In the first 25 years of service, the only changes was the removal of the mainmast and the addition of single-mounted  Oerlikon cannon for AA defence. In the mid-1950s, four of the class were converted to destroyer escorts  and were given radar on a tripod mast and the AA defence was increased to four 20 mm cannon.

Ships

Service history
Serrano and Orella entered service with the Chilean Navy in 1928, followed by the rest of the class in 1929. The light construction of the vessels made them inadequate for the rough waters off the southern coast of Chile, and battleship deployments to that region required that the Serrano class be left behind and older destroyers provide escort. As Chile remained neutral during World War II, the service lives of the Serrano class remained relatively uneventful. Following the war, four of the class, Serrano, Hyatt, Orella and Riquelme, were converted to destroyer escorts in the mid-1950s. The two unmodified ships, Aldea and Videla were decommissioned in 1957 and the four destroyer escorts remained in service until 1962.

See also

Notes

Citations

References
 
 

 

Destroyer classes
 
Chile–United Kingdom relations